Flash (1969) is an album by Moving Sidewalks.

Track listing

Original 1969 Issue
All Songs Published By Tantara Music, except where noted.
"Flashback" (Steve Ames) 4:44
"Scoun Da Be" (Tom Moore) 2:08
"You Make Me Shake" (Billy Gibbons) 3:03
"You Don't Know the Life" (Moore) 3:54
"Pluto - Sept. 31st" (Gibbons, Ames) 5:14
"No Good to Cry" (Al Anderson; Onesider Ltd.-Barrisue) 4:33
"Crimson Witch" (Gibbons) 3:07
"Joe Blues" (Gibbons, Moore, Dan Mitchell, Don Summers) 7:36
"Eclipse" (Gibbons, Ames) 3:51
"Reclipse" (Gibbons, Ames) 2:32

Bonus Tracks (added to Akarma Records' 2000 re-issue)
"99th Floor" (Gibbons) 2:17
"What Are You Going To Do" (Gibbons) 2:29
"I Want To Hold Your Hand" (Lennon, McCartney) 3:20 
"Need Me" (Gibbons) 2:14
"Every Night A New Surprise" (Ames) 2:58

Personnel
Bill "Billy" Gibbons: Guitars, Harmonica, Vocal
Tom Moore: Organ, Piano
Don Summers: Bass
Dan Mitchell: Drums, Percussion
Isaac Costa: Keyboards, Violin, Flute

Production
Produced By Steve Ames
Recording Engineers: Bert Frilot, Doyle Jones
Mix & Re-Mix: Neal Ceppos

References

External links
 

1968 debut albums
Tantara Records albums
Moving Sidewalks albums